Huai'an Modern Tram is a tram line operating in the city of Huai'an, running between Huai’an Gymnasium and South Gate stops. It is an at-grade and catenary-free tram system. It began operations on 28 December 2015.

Length and stations

Stations

References

Railway lines opened in 2015
2015 establishments in China